The olive snake eel (Ophichthus rutidoderma, also known as the Derby snake-eel) is an eel in the family Ophichthidae (worm/snake eels). It was described by Pieter Bleeker in 1853, originally under the genus Ophisurus. It is a marine, tropical eel which is known from the Indo-Pacific. It forms burrows in soft sediments in shallow waters, and leads a nocturnal lifestyle.

The olive snake eel's diet consists of finfish.

References

Taxa named by Pieter Bleeker
Fish described in 1853
Ophichthus